Farismaneh (also Romanized as Farīsmāneh; also known as Farasmāneh, Faresmāneh, and Parsmān) is a village in Kharrazan Rural District, in the Central District of Tafresh County, Markazi Province, Iran. At the 2006 census, its population was 102, in 41 families.

References 

Populated places in Tafresh County